Soulage is a surname. Notable people with the surname include:

 (born 1948), French politician
Daniel Soulage (1942–2020), French politician
Marcelle Soulage (1894–1970), French pianist, music critic and composer

See also
Soulages (disambiguation)
Solage

French-language surnames